Aardvark is a maze video game for the Commodore 64, and Commodore 16 published by Bug-Byte in 1986. Aardvark is based on 1982 arcade game Anteater and 1983 Atari 8-bit family Ardy The Aardwark designed by Chris Oberth''.

Gameplay
The player must collect ant larva using the snout of an aardvark.

References

1986 video games
Bug-Byte Software games
Commodore 16 and Plus/4 games
Commodore 64 games
Fictional aardvarks
Single-player video games
Video game clones
Video games about ants
Video games about insects
Video games developed in the United Kingdom